Daisy Jepkemei (born February 13, 1996) is a  Kenyan born long distance running athlete.  Since January 29, 2022, she represents Kazakhstan.  While representing Kenya at age 16, she was the steeplechase champion at the 2012 World Junior Championships in Athletics (for athletes under age 20) as well as the 2013 African Youth Athletics Championships.  She was also second place in the 3000 metres at those same championships.  Her personal best of 9:06.66, set in 2019 at the Weltklasse Zürich meet ranks her in the top 50 athletes of all time.

References

External links

Living people
1996 births
Kenyan female steeplechase runners
Kenyan female middle-distance runners
Kenyan female long-distance runners
Kenyan female cross country runners
Kazakhstani female middle-distance runners
Kazakhstani female long-distance runners
21st-century Kenyan women